The 1969 Bolivian Primera División, the first division of Bolivian football (soccer), was played by 14 teams. The champion was Universitario de La Paz.

La Paz Group

National Stage

Group A

Group B

Group C

Second stage

Final Group

External links
 Official website of the LFPB 

Bolivian Primera División seasons
Bolivia
1969 in Bolivian sport